Fred A. Mueller (born November 15, 1868, in North Milwaukee, Wisconsin) was a member of the Wisconsin State Assembly. Mueller was elected to the Assembly in 1924. Additionally, he was Town Clerk of Center, Outagamie County, Wisconsin. He was a Republican.

References

People from Milwaukee County, Wisconsin
People from Outagamie County, Wisconsin
City and town clerks
1868 births
Year of death missing
Republican Party members of the Wisconsin State Assembly